2019 COSAFA Women's U17 Championship was the first edition of COSAFA U-17 Women's Championship and took place on September 20th–29th 2019, in Mauritius. Guest nation Uganda become champions after winning 2-1 in the final to South Africa.

Participants
All the 14 COSAFA nations U17 teams along with Réunion were eligible for the tournament, and 7 took part. For this tournament CECAFA member Uganda was also invited.

 (host)

 (guest)

Venues

Group stage
The teams were drawn into two groups of four out of which two advanced to the semi-finals from each group.

Group A

Group B

Knockout stage

Semi-finals

Bronze medal game

Final

Top Scorers

References

External links
Official website

 COSAFA Under-17 Championship
 2019 in African football